Saint Antony the Younger (78511 November 865) was a Byzantine military officer who became a monk and saint. He is commemorated by the Eastern Orthodox Church on 1 December.

Biography
Saint Antony was born John Echimos (Ἰωάννης Ἔχιμος) at Phossaton near Jerusalem in 785. His parents were Photeinos and Irene, and he had at least a brother named David and a sister named Theodoule.

According to his hagiography, as a child he was brought to the hermit John, who foretold his future. There he entered imperial service, probably in the Byzantine navy. In 821 or 822 he was promoted to ek prosopou (deputy governor) of the Cibyrrhaeot Theme. He held the post until 825, although he may have been promoted to thematic governor (strategos) in the meantime. He participated in the suppression of the rebellion of Thomas the Slav in 822–823, then spent ten months in Constantinople in 823–824, before returning to his theme and leading the repulsion of an Arab attack on either Attaleia or Syllaion.

In 825, just as he was about to be married, he was secretly tonsured by the stylite monk Eustratios, and adopted the monastic name Antony. Joined by his servant Theodore, he spent some time at Amorion, before moving on to Pylae and Nicaea, and thence to the Agauron or Pandemos Monastery on the Bithynian Olympus. His hagiography claims that during these journeys he was repeatedly rescued from need in miraculous manner.  In 829 or 830 he was tried on the orders of Emperor Theophilos by the epi ton deeseon Stephen for his persecution of Thomas the Slav's adherents after the end of his rebellion, and was imprisoned for five months at Constantinople. After being whipped, he was released, and returned to Agauron. Sometime later (Raymond Janin places this between 837 and 843) he went to Briles, where he lived in a chapel dedicated to Saint Panteleimon. He then spent some time in the Monastery of Heraclius at Kios, returned to Agauron until 842, and then went again to the Monastery of Heraclius until 848, when he moved to the metochion of All Saints in Constantinople.

In  he cured Petronas, the uncle of Emperor Michael III, who became his disciple. The two had a very close relationship, and Antony is said to have prophesied Petronas' great victory over the Arabs in 863 at the Battle of Lalakaon. In that year, he moved to Ephesus, before returning to Constantinople in 865, spending the final days until his death on 11 November in the Monastery of Leo the Deacon.

He is commemorated by the Eastern Orthodox Church on 11 November and 1 December.

Hagiography
His hagiography was a disciple who visited Antony shortly before the latter's death. Preserved in several manuscripts, is a valuable historical source as it is "rich in information about Byzantine medical services, every-day life, law, and the administrative system" (A. Kazhdan).

References

Sources
 
 
 

785 births
865 deaths
9th-century Byzantine military personnel
9th-century Byzantine monks
9th-century Christian saints
Byzantine admirals
Governors of the Cibyrrhaeot Theme
Byzantine people of the Arab–Byzantine wars
Byzantine prisoners and detainees
Byzantine saints of the Eastern Orthodox Church
Saints from the Holy Land